The Texas Rose Festival, a three-day event held annually in Tyler, Texas, celebrates the role of the rose-growing industry in the local economy. The festivities, taking place during the third weekend of October, draw thousands of tourists to the city each year.

History
The first Tyler Rose Festival was organized by Tyler Garden Club members, local rose growers and the Chamber of Commerce in October 1933 for the purpose of focusing attention on the importance of the rose industry to Tyler, and to showcase the town's elegance; it was renamed the Texas Rose Festival during the Texas Centennial in 1936. Aside from the festival's suspension during World War II & in 2020, it has been an annual event.

The Rose Queen and her court
Many of the festival's events center on the Rose Queen and her court, who wear lavish gowns and costumes that are often in keeping with the theme of the year's festival. These participants generally come from wealthy backgrounds  and often have long family histories with the festival; many have played various roles in the events since childhood. The queen and her court are chosen by the President of the Texas Rose Festival Association who works in the organization for 4 years before taking on the role as president.

In addition to the Rose Queen, the court includes:
 The Duchess of the Rose Growers, a member of a rose-growing family selected by and representing the Texas Rose Growers Association.
 Out-of-town duchesses and escorts, sponsored by a family involved in the Rose Festival and invited because of relationships with Tyler residents.
  Ladies in waiting, a select group of young women from Tyler, in their sophomore year of college, whose families have been involved in the festival for several years.
 Train bearers, scepter bearers and attendants to the queen, usually elementary-school-aged children whose families are involved in the festival.

Rose Queens include:
2021 Anna Grace Hallmark
2020 Suspension of Rose Festival caused by COVID-19 pandemic.
2019 Hanna Claire Waits
2018 Amanda Elaine Hiles
2017 Emily Kaye Evans
2016 Mallory Kristine Curtis
2015 Madeline Shirley Wynne
2014 Kathryn Elizabeth Peltier
2013 Rachel Vanderpool Clyde
2012 Haley McGrede Anderson 
2011 Morgan Elizabeth Rippy
2010 Mary-Lawson Bracken Walden
2009 Emily Anne Austin
2008 Sarah Elizabeth Clyde
2007 Grace Hartley Ramey (Cryer)
2006 Lauren Frances Jones (Stoltz)
2005 Katherine Noel King (Gibson)
2004 Lauren French Sanford
2003 Elizabeth Arlene Lilly
2002 Audrey Elizabeth Bell (Mazzu)
2001 Martha Claire Woldert
2000 Caroline Malone Key
1999 Joan Lindsay Burroughs (Woldert)
1998 Meridith Leigh Patterson (Hayes)
1997 Elizabeth Marsh Smith (Ortega)
1996 Anna Elizabeth Clyde (Malone)
1995 Martha Lindsey Wolf 
1994 Michael Katherine McArthur 
1993 Erin Elizabeth Simpson
1992 Kristie Leigh Hardin
1991 Ashley Jean Powell (Sutton)
1990 Katherine Claire Duncan
1989 Samantha Price Fischer (Skaran, McPherson, Kyle)
1988 Lora Elizabeth Clyde (Arnold)
1987 Allyson Anne Henry (Sullivan)
1986 Marla Katherine Hughes (Reeder)
1985 Mollie Bess Arnold (Winston)
1984 Diana Patricia Taylor (McMillan)
1983 Jane Alice Boyd Hartley (Coker)
1982 Jamie Clara Arnold (Landes)
1981 Kay Elizabeth Fair
1980 Alicia Staley Wynne (Gray)
1979 Claire Martin Ramey (Turner)
1978 Virginia Rice Fair (Gowin)
1977 Amy Jane Lawrence (Walton)
1976 Hollee Susann Hedge (Clawater)
1975 Nanette Oge (West)
1974 Eloise Clyde (Chandler)
1973 Amanda Warner (Jackson)
1972 Cynthia Eileen Stringer (Martin)
1971 Mary Martha Fair
1970 Melinda Riter (Shoemake)
1969 Eugenia Key (Son)
1968 Louise Grelling Spence (Griffeth)
1967 Katherine Clyde (Ramsey)
1966 Lynn Clawater (Staley)
1965 Elaine McKay (Harman)
1964 Carolyn Louise Shaw 
1963 Lometa Hudnall 
1962 Harriet Sue Caldwell (McArthur)
1961 Lousanne Orr Wise (Yandell)
1960 Carol Joan Dean (Wade)
1959 Elizabeth Byars (Summers)
1958 Patricia Lewis (Chambers)
1957 Kay Howard (Garland)
1956 Gail Hudson (White)
1955 Maymerle Shirley (Brown)
1954 Joanne Miller (Glass)
1953 Sally Kay
1952 Carol Ellison (Stollenwerck)
1951 Catherine Roberts
1950 Laura Jill King (Ramey)
1949 Rose Marie Young (Reynolds)
1948 Mary Anne Nenney (McCain)
1947 Carolyn Riviere (McArthur)
1942-1946 Suspension of Rose Festival During World War II.
1941 Elizabeth Calhoun (Bobbitt)
1940 Mary John Grelling (Spence)
1939 Dorothy Bell (Finn)
1938 Frances Connally
1937 Katherine Booty
1936 Gertrude Ann Windsor (Richardson)
1935 Margaret Hunt Hill
1934 Louise Boren
1933, the 1st Rose Queen, Margaret Copeland (Donoghue) from Palestine, Texas

Rose Festival events
Rose Festival events open to the public generally include:

 A Vespers service, held at the home church of the reigning Rose Queen
 The Queen's Tea, in which the public is invited to mingle with the Rose Queen and her court at the Tyler Municipal Rose Garden
 A Men's Luncheon and a Ladies' Luncheon, featuring guest speakers
 Queen's Coronation ceremonies
 The Rose Festival Parade, featuring floats, bands and a number of community groups
 A Rose Show and gardening seminars
 The Rose Festival Arts and crafts Show at Tyler's Rose Garden.

There are also many other events such as an art show; a car show; doll, bear and toy shows; an arts and crafts fair; and symphony concerts in the park.

The Rose Parade is easily the biggest part of the Rose Festival. This parade takes place on the Saturday morning of the festival, and starts on Fifth St. and travels down Erwin to the Rose Stadium where it ends.  It is free to watch the parade on the streets, but you must buy a ticket to be admitted into the shaded side of the stadium. People all over come and line up on the streets of Tyler to see the girls in their magnificent dresses and cheer them on. The girls participating in the festival ride on floats depending on their presentation party, with the Queen and her court riding on the last few floats. The Queen gets her own float. When the floats get to the stadium, they go along the track for one last viewing, and then end.

A number of private parties also coincide with the festival, including the Queen's Coronation Ball hosted by the Order of the Rose. On the last night of the festival, the families and friends of the girls participating sit and watch each girl get presented. The girls who are from Tyler, Texas wear white ball gowns, while the girls from out of the city wear jewel colored gowns. The Queen is the last to be presented, and after all the girls are done there is a party with music and dancing.

See also
List of festivals in the United States
List of museums in East Texas

References

External links
 Official Texas Rose Festival site
 Stories on the 2005 festival, from the Tyler Morning Telegraph
 Brief article and bibliography, from the Handbook of Texas Online

Festivals in Texas
Tyler, Texas
Tourist attractions in Smith County, Texas
Debutante balls
Flower festivals in the United States
Balls in the United States